Attagenus turcomanus is a type of beetle that belongs to the family of skin beetles (Dermestidae). The scientific name of this type was described for the first time in 1963 by Zhantiev.

References 

Dermestidae
Beetles described in 1963